Darivar (also Romanized as Darīvār) is a village in Gafr and Parmon Rural District, Gafr and Parmon District, Bashagard County, Hormozgan Province, Iran. At the 2006 census, its population was 116, in 23 families.

References 

Populated places in Bashagard County